Triggerfish are about 40 species of often brightly colored fish of the family Balistidae. Often marked by lines and spots, they inhabit tropical and subtropical oceans throughout the world, with the greatest species richness in the Indo-Pacific. Most are found in relatively shallow, coastal habitats, especially at coral reefs, but a few, such as the oceanic triggerfish (Canthidermis maculata), are pelagic. While several species from this family are popular in the marine aquarium trade, they are often notoriously ill-tempered.

Anatomy and appearance

Triggerfish have an oval-shaped, highly compressed body. The head is large, terminating in a small but strong-jawed mouth with teeth adapted for crushing shells. The eyes are small, set far back from the mouth, at the top of the head. The anterior dorsal fin is reduced to a set of three spines. The first spine is stout and by far the longest. All three are normally retracted into a groove. Characteristic of the order Tetraodontiformes, the anal and posterior dorsal fins are capable of undulating from side to side to provide slow movement and comprise their primary mode of propulsion. The sickle-shaped caudal fin is used only to escape predators.

The two pelvic fins are overlaid by skin for most of their length and fused to form a single spine, terminated by very short rays, their only external evidence. Gill plates (opercula), although present, are also not visible, overlaid by the tough skin, covered with rough, rhomboid scales that form a stout armor on their bodies. The only gill opening is a vertical slit, directly above the pectoral fins. This peculiar covering of the gill plates is shared with other members of the Tetradontae. Each jaw contains a row of four teeth on either side, while the upper jaw contains an additional set of six plate-like pharyngeal teeth.

As a protection against predators, triggerfish can erect the first two dorsal spines: The first (anterior) spine is locked in place by erection of the short second spine, and can be unlocked only by depressing the second, "trigger" spine, hence the family name "triggerfish".

With the exception of a few species from the genus Xanthichthys, the sexes of all species in this family are similar in appearance.

Behavior
The rather bizarre anatomy of the triggerfish reflects its typical diet of slow-moving, bottom dwelling crustaceans, mollusks, sea urchins and other echinoderms, generally creatures with protective shells and spines. Many will also take small fishes and some, notably the members of the genus Melichthys, feed on algae. A few, for example the redtoothed triggerfish (Odonus niger), mainly feed on plankton. They are known to exhibit a high level of intelligence for a fish, and have the ability to learn from previous experiences.

Some triggerfish species can be quite aggressive when guarding their eggs. Both the Picasso (Rhinecanthus aculeatus) and titan triggerfish (Balistoides viridescens) viciously defend their nests against intruders, including scuba divers and snorkelers. Their territory extends in a cone from the nest toward the surface, so swimming upwards can put a diver further into the fishes' territory; a horizontal swim away from the nest site is best when confronted by an angry triggerfish. Unlike the relatively small picasso triggerfish, the titan triggerfish poses a serious threat to inattentive divers due to its large size and powerful teeth.

Male territoriality

Triggerfish males migrate to their traditional spawning sites prior to mating and establish territories. Some male species (i.e. Balistes carolinensis and Pseudobalistes flavimarginatus) build hollow nests within their territories. Triggerfish males are fierce in guarding their territories as having a territory is essential for reproduction. A male's territory is used for spawning and parental care. Most male territories are located over a sandy sea bottom or on a rocky reef. A single territory usually includes more than one female, and the male mates with all of the females residing in or visiting his territory (polygyny). In Hachijojima, Izu Islands, Japan, one male crosshatch triggerfish (Xanthichthys mento) has up to three females in his territory at the same time, and mates with them in pairs. Each male red-toothed triggerfish (Odonus niger) mates with more than 10 females in his territory on the same day. Yellow margin triggerfish (Pseudobalistes flavimarginatus) also exhibit polygyny.

Spawning and biparental care
Triggerfish spawning is timed in relation to lunar cycles, tides, and time of changeover of tides. In relation to lunar cycles, eggs are observed 2–6 days before the full moon and 3–5 days before the new moon. In relation to tides, spawning happens 1–5 days before the spring tide. In relation to timing of tides, eggs are observed on days when high tides take place around sunset.

Male and female triggerfish perform certain prespawning behaviors: blowing and touching. A male and female blow water on the sandy bottom (usually in the same spot at the same time) and set up their egg site. They touch their abdomens on the bottom as if they are spawning. During actual spawning, eggs are laid on the sandy sea bottom (triggerfish are demersal spawners despite their large size). Eggs are scattered and attached to sand particles. Triggerfish eggs are usually very small (diameter of 0.5–0.6 mm) and are easily spread by waves. After spawning, both the male and female participate in caring for the fertilized eggs (biparental egg care). A female triggerfish stays near the spawning ground, around 5 m off the bottom, and guards the eggs within her territory against intruders. Some common intruders include Parupeneus multifasciatus, Zanclus cornutus, Prionurus scalprum, and conspecifics. Besides guarding, females roll, fan, and blow water on eggs to provide oxygen to the embryos, thereby inducing hatching. This behavior of female triggerfish is called "tending", and males rarely perform this behavior. A male triggerfish stays farther above the eggs and guards all the females and eggs in his territory. Males exhibit aggressive behaviors against conspecific males near the boundaries of their territories.

Mating systems

In crosshatch triggerfish (Xanthichthys mento) and yellow margin triggerfish (Pseudobalistes flavimarginatus), eggs are spawned in the morning and they hatch after the sunset on the same day. After hatching of embryos, the female crosshatch triggerfish leaves the male's territory. This mating system is an example of male-territory-visiting polygamy. Triggerfishes exhibit other types of mating systems, as well, such as a nonterritorial-female (NTF) polygyny and territorial-female (TF) polygyny. In NTF polygyny, nonterritorial females stay in the male's territory and reproduce. In TF polygyny, a female owns territory within a male's territory and will spawn in her territory.

Life history
Triggerfish lay their demersal eggs in a small hole dug in the sea bottom. Off Florida, juveniles of some species of triggerfishes are found in floating Sargassum, where they feed on the small shrimp, crabs, and mollusks found there.

Edibility

Some species of triggerfish, such as the titan triggerfish, may be ciguatoxic and should be avoided. Others, however, such as the grey triggerfish (Balistes capriscus), are edible.

Gallery

References

External links
 
 
 

 
Tetraodontiformes
Extant Eocene first appearances